Jean-Guy Hamelin (October 8, 1925 – March 1, 2018) was a Canadian Catholic bishop.

Born in 1925 in Saint-Sévérin-de-Proulxville, Hamelin was ordained to the priesthood on June 11, 1949, in Trois-Rivières, Québec and was named first bishop of the Roman Catholic Diocese of Rouyn-Noranda, Canada on November 29, 1973. He retired on November 30, 2001, succeeded by Dorylas Moreau and named Bishop Emeritus.

Hamelin died on March 1, 2018, aged 92 in Rouyn-Noranda.

References 

1925 births
2018 deaths
French Quebecers
20th-century Roman Catholic bishops in Canada
Roman Catholic bishops of Rouyn-Noranda
People from Mauricie